Gladstone Agbamu (born 23 November 1944) is a Nigerian hurdler. He competed in the men's 400 metres hurdles at the 1972 Summer Olympics.

References

External links
 

1944 births
Living people
Athletes (track and field) at the 1972 Summer Olympics
Athletes (track and field) at the 1974 British Commonwealth Games
Nigerian male hurdlers
Olympic athletes of Nigeria
Commonwealth Games competitors for Nigeria
Place of birth missing (living people)